Anita Simoncini (born 14 April 1999) is a Sammarinese singer who represented San Marino in the Junior Eurovision Song Contest 2014 as a member of the girl group The Peppermints with the song "Breaking My Heart". She also represented San Marino in the Eurovision Song Contest 2015 along with Michele Perniola with the song "Chain of Lights".

Life and career

Junior Eurovision Song Contest 2014
On 26 September 2014, it was announced that The Peppermints would represent San Marino at the Junior Eurovision Song Contest 2014 in Malta with the song "Breaking My Heart". The song along with themselves was presented to the public at a press conference in San Marino on 13 October 2014. They performed third in the final, after Krisia, Hasan & Ibrahim from Bulgaria and before Josie from Croatia. They placed fifteenth achieving 21 points.

Eurovision Song Contest 2015
On 27 November 2014, it was announced that Simoncini along with Michele Perniola (the brother of one of Simoncini's bandmates Raffaella Perniola) would represent San Marino at the Eurovision Song Contest 2015 in Vienna singing a duet. Their song, "Chain of Lights" was revealed on 13 March 2015.

Discography

Singles

With The Peppermints

Solo

See also
 San Marino in the Junior Eurovision Song Contest 2014
 San Marino in the Eurovision Song Contest 2015

References

1999 births
Eurovision Song Contest entrants of 2015
Junior Eurovision Song Contest entrants
Living people
Eurovision Song Contest entrants for San Marino
Sammarinese child singers
Sammarinese women singers
Sammarinese pop singers
21st-century women singers